Smith Pagerie Site is an archaeological site located at Ephratah in Fulton County, New York, US. It is also known as Las. 11–4, New York State Office of Parks, Recreation, and Historic Preservation Unique Site No. A035-04-0002. It is one of three Mohawk Indian village sites excavated by the archaeologist Robert E. Funk in 1969–1970.

The site is dated from 1560–1580. It occupies  just east of Caroga Creek, contains the remains of twelve to fifteen longhouses, and was probably surrounded by a palisade. Its population is estimated to have been around 1350.

It was listed on the National Register of Historic Places in 1980.

References

Archaeological sites on the National Register of Historic Places in New York (state)
Fulton County, New York
Iroquois populated places
Former Native American populated places in the United States
Mohawk tribe
Native American history of New York (state)
National Register of Historic Places in Fulton County, New York